All Hell's Breaking Loose Down at Little Kathy Wilson's Place is a mini-album by the band Wolfsbane released in 1990. The song "Kathy Wilson" was inspired by the 1953 sci-fi film Invaders From Mars, and features lines from the film voiced by Blaze Bayley.

Many of the songs would become firm fan favourites during Wolfbane's tour in support of Iron Maiden (a band that Blaze Bayley would later join in 1994 but leave 5 years later).

The cover artwork was by Simon Piasecki Maxted.

Track listing 
 "Steel" - 4:57
 "Paint the Town Red" - 3:06
 "Loco" - 3:19
 "Hey Babe" - 4:42
 "Totally Nude" - 3:18
 "Kathy Wilson" - 3:47

Personnel
Blaze Bayley: Vocals
Jason Edwards: Guitar
Jeff Hately: Bass
Steve Ellet: Drums

References

1990 EPs
Wolfsbane (band) albums
American Recordings (record label) EPs
Albums produced by Brendan O'Brien (record producer)